The football tournament at the 1938 Bolivarian Games  was held in Bogotá from 6 to 22 August.

Five of the six participating countries entered the tournament, which were Peru, Bolivia, Ecuador, Colombia, Venezuela. This was the first and only time that full national teams for every country took 
part in this tournament. The gold medal was won by Peru, who earned 8 points.

Squads

Table
Each team played against each of the other teams. 2 points system used.

As Bolivia and Ecuador were tied for second place, a playoff was disputed.

Results

First round

Silver medal match

References

Bolivarian Games
1938
1938 Bolivarian Games
1938